The James Graham House, in Hardin County, Tennessee near Savannah, Tennessee, was built in 1822.  It was listed on the National Register of Historic Places in 1991.

It is an I-house with Federal influence.

The original owner operated a grist mill on Horse Creek nearby.

References

I-houses in Tennessee
National Register of Historic Places in Hardin County, Tennessee
Buildings and structures completed in 1822